is a Japanese manga series written and illustrated by Takayuki Yamaguchi. It is based on the first chapter of the novel Suruga-jō Gozen Jiai by Norio Nanjō. An anime television adaptation, aired on Wowow from July to October 2007. The series was directed by Hiroshi Hamasaki, written by Seishi Minakami, and produced by Madhouse.

The anime was licensed in North America by Funimation under the fully translated title Shigurui: Death Frenzy. The licensing was announced in May 2008 and the full series was released in March 2009, on Blu-ray and DVD. The manga and anime are both known for their graphic violence and sexual content.

Plot
The story begins in 1629 Shizuoka during Tokugawa Tadanaga's rule. The daimyō staged a tournament where the participants fought with real steel Japanese swords rather than bokken ("wooden sword"), against his vassals' strong objection. The story revolves around the first match between the one-armed swordsman Fujiki Gennosuke and the blind samurai Irako Seigen and deals with the circumstances that led the two to participate in Tokugawa's tournament.

Characters

The stoic star pupil of the Kogan dojo. In the present time in his duel with Seigen he has only one arm but it is noted that his back muscles could theoretically make up for lost strength. Fujiki is very loyal to Kogan (his master), and is said to be most likely to succeed as the school's master.

An ambitious man who seeks to raise his status; unlike Gennosuke, who has genuine love and respect for the school and its fortunes, Seigen cares for very little besides the wealth that will come his way if he can rise through the ranks. In the present time, he is blind and has a deep cut in one of his feet. Years before, he joined the Kogan-Ryuu school afterwards and was eventually picked to become the successor over Gennosuke Fujiki, but he and Kogan had a falling out which resulted in his present-day blindness.

A master of the Kogan-Ryuu school and Gennosuke's senior. A hulk of a man, Ushimata uses an immensely large wooden sword (Seigen comments that it appears to be a suburitō) which he wields with ease.

The Grandmaster of the Kogan-Ryuu school. Mentally unbalanced most of the time, he regains his sanity most often in the period between fall and winter. Kogan cares nothing for his daughter, Mie, seeing her only as a tool to continue his bloodline. He has a small deformity, a sixth finger on one of his hands. His technique "Nagare Boshi" (Shooting Star) is known and feared by many Samurai.

The daughter of Kogan Iwamoto. Betrothed to Seigen Irako, she instead wants to be with Gennosuke Fujiki; however, she seemingly has little to no value to her father—who greatly resents that he had a daughter instead of a son—except as breeding stock.

The long-suffering concubine of Kogan. She has been consistently taunted with a Children's Song and the masses would flee at her approach. Early on, she appears resigned to her life with him.

Media

Manga

Anime

The series was adapted into a 12-episode anime series based on the first 32 chapters (or the initial six and a half volumes) by Madhouse and broadcast on Wowow from July 19 to October 12, 2007. The series was directed by Hiroshi Hamasaki and written by Seishi Minakami. Funimation licensed the series for release in North America. The series was later added to iTunes.

Reception
Shigurui was nominated for the 15th annual Tezuka Osamu Cultural Prize in 2011. The series ranked fifth and fourth on Takarajimasha's Kono Manga ga Sugoi! list of best manga of 2007 and 2008 for male readers.

References

External links
 Shigurui at Funimation
 

2003 manga
2007 anime television series debuts
Akita Shoten manga
Anime and manga based on novels
Funimation
Madhouse (company)
Samurai in anime and manga
Seinen manga
Wowow original programming